Gaplek is Javanese and Indonesian cuisine made from sliced dried root of cassava. It is mainly produced in the limestone uplands of Java, where soils are poor enough that rice grows poorly. The cassava root is harvested, peeled, sliced into pieces 6 to 8 inches long, and dried in the sun for 1 to 3 days. After drying, the gaplek is stored in a cool, dry place. If sufficiently dry it is relatively unaffected by pests. When other food sources are unavailable or too expensive, the gaplek pieces are pounded into small bits and cooked like rice. They also can be used as raw material for making another cuisine like tiwul, growol, gogik and gatot. Gaplek is popular among civilians in Trenggalek. Some says that this food is called gaplek because people who usually eat feel so full that which they say gaplek means really full.

Referensi 
Indonesian words and phrases
Javanese cuisine